The glossary of Hebrew toponyms gives translations of Hebrew terms commonly found as components in Hebrew toponyms.

B

E

G

H

K

M

N

R

T

See also
List of Hebrew place names
Hebraization of Palestinian place names

Further reading
M. E. J. Richardson, "Hebrew Toponyms", Tyndale Bulletin Vol. 20, Issue 1, 1969, 
Joseph Jacobs, Place-names, Jewish Encyclopedia
Yoel Elitzur, "Toponyms in the Land of Israel", In: Encyclopedia of Hebrew Language and Linguistics, 2013, vol. 3, pp. 779-778 

Toponymy
Geography-related lists
Hebrew toponyms
Hebrew toponyms

Hebrew language
Wikipedia glossaries using description lists